Jackson Township is an inactive township in Monroe County, in the U.S. state of Missouri.

Jackson Township was established in 1831, taking its name from President Andrew Jackson.

References

Townships in Missouri
Townships in Monroe County, Missouri